Events from the year 1688 in France

Incumbents
 Monarch – Louis XIV

Events

Births

Full date missing
Charles-Nicolas Cochin the Elder, engraver (died 1754)
Jacques Chereau, engraver and printmaker (died 1776)

Deaths

Full date missing
Antoine Furetière, scholar (born 1619)
Philippe Quinault, librettist and dramatist (born 1635)
Abraham Duquesne, naval officer (born c.1610)
Claude Mellan, engraver and painter (born 1598)
Nicolas Denys, aristocrat, explorer, colonizer and soldier in New France (born 1598?)

See also

References

1680s in France